Carlos Lamonte Crawford (born October 4, 1971) is an American former professional baseball right-handed pitcher, who played in one game for the Philadelphia Phillies of Major League Baseball (MLB) in .

Crawford made his Major League debut on June 7, 1996, and, not having slept the night before due to excitement, allowed ten runs in less than four innings pitched. , his eight unearned runs allowed are the most in a Major League debut since unearned runs became an official statistic in 1913.

Crawford was drafted by the Cleveland Indians in the 51st round of the 1990 amateur draft.

References

External links

1971 births
Living people
Philadelphia Phillies players
Major League Baseball pitchers
Baseball players from North Carolina
Montreat Cavaliers baseball players
Nashville Sounds players
Canton-Akron Indians players
Kinston Indians players
Buffalo Bisons (minor league) players
Nashua Pride players
Sonoma County Crushers players
Burlington Indians players (1986–2006)
Calgary Cannons players
American expatriate baseball players in Canada
African-American baseball players
Carolina Mudcats players
Columbus Red Stixx players
Gulf Coast Indians players
Scranton/Wilkes-Barre Red Barons players
20th-century African-American sportspeople